The South African Democratic Congress (Sadeco) was formed in 2008 by Ziba Jiyane, the founder of the National Democratic Convention (NADECO), after he left in a dispute over leadership. Jiyane had been the Secretary-General of the Inkatha Freedom Party. The party won no seats in the 2009 general election.

In April 2011, ahead of the local elections, Jiyane and the SADECO Federal Council voted to disband the party and join the much larger Democratic Alliance.

Election results

References

Defunct political parties in South Africa
2008 establishments in South Africa
Political parties established in 2008
Political parties disestablished in 2011
Democratic Alliance (South Africa)